The 1957 Auckland City mayoral by-election was held to fill the vacant position of Mayor of Auckland. The polling was conducted using the standard first-past-the-post electoral method.

Background
The by-election was triggered by the death of sitting Mayor Thomas Ashby. Five candidates put their names forward for the contest, with Deputy-Mayor Keith Buttle elected the new Mayor. Councillor Dove-Myer Robinson's United Independents (who had backed Ashby a year earlier) ticket chose to neither contest the election nor endorse a candidate.

Results
The following table gives the election results:

Notes

References

Mayoral elections in Auckland
1957 elections in New Zealand
Politics of the Auckland Region
1950s in Auckland